The 1944–45 Connecticut Huskies men's basketball team represented University of Connecticut in the 1944–45 collegiate men's basketball season. The Huskies completed the season with a 5–11 overall record. The Huskies were members of the New England Conference, where they ended the season with a 4–2 record. The Huskies played their home games at Hawley Armory in Storrs, Connecticut, and were led by ninth-year head coach Don White.

Schedule 

|-
!colspan=12 style=""| Regular Season

Schedule Source:

References 

UConn Huskies men's basketball seasons
Connecticut
1944 in sports in Connecticut
1945 in sports in Connecticut